Magetan Station (station code: MAG, formerly Barat Station) is a third-class railway station in Karangsono, Barat, Magetan Regency, East Java, Indonesia, operated by Kereta Api Indonesia. This is the only railway station in Magetan Regency and located 20 km northeast from capital city of Magetan. 

This station's new building is operated—which has four tracks (two main lines and two passing tracks)—since Babadan–Geneng double track segment activation on 16 October 2019. Moreover, this former railway station name, Barat, has been changed.

Services

Passenger services

Mixed class
 Brantas, destination of  via  and

Economy class
 Matarmaja, destination of  via  and 

Gallery

References

External links 

 Kereta Api Indonesia - Indonesian railway company

Magetan Regency
Railway stations in East Java